Nightmares and Geezenstacks is a short story collection consisting of 47 horror, science fiction and crime stories by American writer Fredric Brown. It was first published in 1961 by Bantam Books and most recently republished by Valancourt Books.

Contents 
 Nasty 
 Abominable 
 Rebound [“The Power”] 
 Nightmare in Gray 
 Nightmare in Green 
 Nightmare in White 
 Nightmare in Blue 
 Nightmare in Yellow 
 Nightmare in Red 
 Unfortunately 
 Granny’s Birthday 
 Cat Burglar 
 The House 
 Second Chance 
 Great Lost Discoveries I - Invisibility 
 Great Lost Discoveries II - Invulnerability 
 Great Lost Discoveries III - Immortality
 Dead Letter [“The Letter”] 
 Recessional 
 Hobbyist 
 The Ring of Hans Carvel 
 Vengeance Fleet [“Vengeance, Unlimited”]
 Rope Trick 
 Fatal Error [“The Perfect Crime”] 
 The Short Happy Lives of Eustace Weaver I
 The Short Happy Lives of Eustace Weaver II
 The Short Happy Lives of Eustace Weaver III
 Expedition 
 Bright Beard 
 Jaycee 
 Contact [“Earthmen Bearing Gifts”] 
 Horse Race 
 Death on the Mountain 
 Bear Possibility
 Not Yet the End 
 Fish Story 
 Three Little Owls (A Fable)
 Runaround [“Starvation”]
 Murder in Ten Easy Lessons [“Ten Tickets to Hades”] 
 Dark Interlude · Fredric Brown & Mack Reynolds 
 Entity Trap [“From These Ashes”]
 The Little Lamb 
 Me and Flapjack and the Martians
 The Joke [“If Looks Could Kill”]
 Cartoonist [“Garrigan’s Bems”]
 The Geezenstacks
 The End [“Nightmare in Time”]

Adaptations 
In 1986, Nancy Doyne adapted The Geezenstacks into a teleplay for the series Tales from the Darkside.

External links 

The Geezenstacks at the IMDb
Nightmares and Geezenstacks page listing at Valancourt Books

1961 short story collections
1961 short stories
Crime short story collections
Short story collections by Fredric Brown